The Hengduan Mountains subalpine conifer forests are a temperate forest in the Hengduan Mountains of southwestern China.  The forests extend within the Jinsha (upper Yangtze) and Yalong River valleys from approximately 32°N to 27°N.  In addition, a portion of the Anning River valley and Mianmian Mountains near Lugu Lake support the subalpine conifer forests.  This region covers northern Yunnan Province, western Sichuan Province, and the extreme eastern edge of the Tibet Autonomous Region.

The Hengduan Mountains subalpine conifer forests are one zone in a range of montane ecosystems that transition between tropical and temperate ecoregions along the southeastern fringe of the Tibetan Plateau. The Hengduan conifer forests are separated into two arms by the Shaluli Mountains.

Environmental groups have recognized this ecoregion as being threatened by "a growing human population and the resulting demand for non-timber forests and wildlife products for medicinal and other uses".

References

Flora of Tibet
Ecoregions of Asia
Ecoregions of China
Forests of China
Montane forests
Palearctic ecoregions
Temperate coniferous forests